Sir John Hunt Community Sports College is a mixed secondary school and sixth form located in the Whitleigh area of Plymouth in the English county of Devon. The school is named after Sir John Hunt (afterwards Baron Hunt), an army officer who is best known as the leader of the successful 1953 British Expedition to Mount Everest.

History
The school was originally known as Whitleigh Secondary Modern School and then Sir John Hunt Community College, before gaining Sports College Status. In 2001 Southway Community College formally merged with Sir John Hunt. Although the school operated over both school campuses for a time, the school was consolidated on the Whitleigh site completely in 2005. Sir John Hunt opened its sixth form in 2010, the last secondary school in Plymouth to do so.

The school is located in the Wood View Learning Community, which also includes Whitleigh Community Primary School and Woodlands Special School, as well other community services such as the Youth Centre. The campus is run by a federated Governing Body. Previously a community school solely administered by Plymouth City Council, in June 2015 Sir John Hunt Community Sports College became a foundation school as part of the Wood View Learning Community Trust. However the school continues to coordinate with Plymouth City Council for admissions.

Academics
Sir John Hunt Community Sports College offers GCSEs and Cambridge Nationals as programmes of study for pupils, while students in the sixth form have the option to study from a range of A-levels and further Cambridge Nationals. Some courses are offered in conjunction with Lipson Co-operative Academy and Tor Bridge High.

Notable former pupils
Kate Nesbitt, The first female member of the British Royal Navy, and the second woman in the British Armed Forces, to be awarded the Military Cross

References

External links
Sir John Hunt Community Sports College official website

Secondary schools in Plymouth, Devon
Foundation schools in Plymouth, Devon
Specialist sports colleges in England